Richmond is a suburb of New Zealand's southernmost city, Invercargill.

Demographics

Richmond had a population of 3,480 at the 2018 New Zealand census, an increase of 138 people (4.1%) since the 2013 census, and an increase of 144 people (4.3%) since the 2006 census. There were 1,479 households. There were 1,662 males and 1,815 females, giving a sex ratio of 0.92 males per female. The median age was 38.7 years (compared with 37.4 years nationally), with 609 people (17.5%) aged under 15 years, 720 (20.7%) aged 15 to 29, 1,533 (44.1%) aged 30 to 64, and 618 (17.8%) aged 65 or older.

Ethnicities were 84.1% European/Pākehā, 15.3% Māori, 4.1% Pacific peoples, 8.2% Asian, and 1.8% other ethnicities (totals add to more than 100% since people could identify with multiple ethnicities).

The proportion of people born overseas was 14.7%, compared with 27.1% nationally.

Although some people objected to giving their religion, 49.4% had no religion, 38.7% were Christian, 0.8% were Hindu, 0.3% were Muslim, 0.7% were Buddhist and 2.5% had other religions.

Of those at least 15 years old, 528 (18.4%) people had a bachelor or higher degree, and 636 (22.2%) people had no formal qualifications. The median income was $30,700, compared with $31,800 nationally. 396 people (13.8%) earned over $70,000 compared to 17.2% nationally. The employment status of those at least 15 was that 1,470 (51.2%) people were employed full-time, 387 (13.5%) were part-time, and 105 (3.7%) were unemployed.

References

Suburbs of Invercargill